Stelios Konstantinidis (born on 6 June 1947) is a Greek former professional footballer who played as a goalkeeper. His nickname was "The Wardrobe", due to his immense, at the standards of the time, physique.

Club career
Konstantinidis started football in 1963, when at the age of 16, he joined the infrastructure departments of AEK Athens. When the manager of the club, Jenő Csaknády saw him play in 1967, impressed by his physique, he immediately promoted him to the first team, where the career of the legendary goalkeeper, Stelios Serafidis, was approaching to its end. A ferocious goalkeeper who "filled" the area and had proverbial exits, Konstantinidis established himself permanently in the starting eleven in 1968. Under Branko Stanković, he was a key contributor to the team's course to the quarter-finals of the European Cup in 1969, where he kept his club with his performances in very crucial matches, as well in the success of 1971 and consisted an irreplaceable member of the team until 1973. He was also key member of the team that won second place in the Balkans Cup in 1967, losing only in the final by Fenerbahçe. After a fracture in his arm, on 3 October 1971 in a home match against Panachaiki, he began losing his position in the starting eleven. With AEK he won 2 Championships in his 5-year presence at the club.

With the presence of Néstor Errea and the promising Lakis Stergioudas from 1972, as well as the transfer of Giorgos Sidiropoulos the following summer, made Konstantinidis leave the club and sign for Atromitos, where he played until 1977, where he ended his career at the age of only 30.

After football
Konstantinidis  actively participates in the events of Veterans Associations of AEK Athens, where he served as their vice president, and follows the team closely.

Honours

AEK Athens
Alpha Ethniki: 1967–68, 1970–71

References

Association football goalkeepers
1947 births
Living people
Greece international footballers
Super League Greece players
AEK Athens F.C. players
Atromitos F.C. players
Footballers from Athens
Greek footballers